Nicholas Paul Harberd  (born 15 July 1956) is Sibthorpian Professor of Plant Science and former head of the Department of Plant Sciences (since 2022 part of the Department of Biology) at the University of Oxford, and Fellow of St John's College, Oxford.

Education
Harberd earned a Bachelor of Arts degree with Honours, a Master of Arts, and PhD in 1981, from the University of Cambridge where he was a student of Christ's College, Cambridge.

Career and research
He was a scientist at the Plant Breeding Institute, Trumpington, Cambridge from 1982 to 1986, and the University of California, Berkeley, from 1986 to 1988.

He is head of the Harberd group, which was located at John Innes Centre, and has been at the University of Oxford since his appointment as Sibthorpian Professor of Plant Sciences in 2007.

With George Coupland, Liam Dolan, Alison Smith, Jonathan Jones, Cathie Martin, Robert Sablowski and Abigail Amey he is a co-author of the textbook Plant Biology.

Awards and honours
Harberd was elected a Fellow of the Royal Society (FRS) in 2009. His nomination reads:

References

1956 births
Living people
Alumni of Christ's College, Cambridge
Fellows of St John's College, Oxford
Academics of the University of East Anglia
Fellows of the Royal Society
British botanists
Statutory Professors of the University of Oxford
University of California, Berkeley staff